In July 2018, 105 Beechcraft B99 were in airline service, all in the Americas:

55: Ameriflight
12: Alpine Air
10: Bemidji Airlines
 10: Freight Runners Express
9: Wiggins Airways
2: Flamingo Air, Hummingbird Air, InterCaribbean Airways
 1: Bar XH Air, Courtesy Air, North Wright Airways and Sky High Aviation Services

Former airline operators in the U.S. and Canada

A considerable number of commuter and regional airlines in the U.S. and Canada previously operated the Beechcraft Model 99 in scheduled passenger service.  The following list of air carriers is taken from Official Airline Guide (OAG) flight schedules from 1974 to 1995:

 Air Canada Connector (operated by Austin Airways) - Canada
 Air East
 Air Kentucky
 Air Mikisew - Canada
 Air New Orleans
 Air North - Canada
 Air Schefferville - Canada
 Air South
 Air Tindi - Canada
 Air Vegas
 Air Wisconsin
 Aklak Air - Canada
 Allegheny Commuter
 Altair Airlines
 American Eagle (operated by Wings West Airlines)
 Austin Airways - Canada
 Bar Harbor Airlines
 Bearskin Airlines - Canada
 Britt Airways
 Business Express
 Canadian Airlines Partner (operated by Pacific Coastal Airlines) - Canada
 Cascade Airways
 Chaparral Airlines
 Chautauqua Airlines - operating as Allegheny Commuter and later as USAir Express
 Coastal Airlines
 Colgan Air
 Command Airways
 Commuter Airlines
 Desert Sun Airlines
 Eastern Express 
 East Hampton Aire
 Executive Airlines - commuter air carrier in Florida and the northeast U.S.
 Frontier Airlines (1950-1986)
 GP Express Airlines
 Golden Pacific Airlines
 Gopher Airlines
 Great Lakes Airlines
 Gulfstream International Airlines
 Henson Airlines
 Kenn Borek Air - Canada
 Lone Star Airlines
 Mackey International Airlines
 Mall Airways
 Marco Island Airways
 Mesa Airlines
 Mesaba Airlines
 Metro Airlines
 Midstate Airlines
 Midwest Commuter Airways
 Mississippi Valley Airlines (MVA)
 Mohawk Airlines (late 1980s commuter air carrier)
 New York Air Connection
 Northeast Express Regional Airlines
 Northwest Airlink
 Northwestern Air - Canada 
 North-Wright Airways - Canada
 Ocean Airways
Orca Airways
 Piedmont Airlines (1948-1989) - Regional Airlines division
 Pacific Coastal Airlines - Canada
 Pilgrim Airlines
 Pioneer Airlines (1980s commuter air carrier)
 Precision Airlines
 Rio Airways
 Royale Airlines
 San Juan Airlines
 Skystream Airlines
 Skyway Commuter
 Skyway of Ocala - operated as Air Florida Commuter
 Southern Frontier Airlines - Canada
 Skyways (formerly Scheduled Skyways)
 Sunbird Airlines
 Texas International Airlines
Transnorthern Airlines
 Transwestern Airlines
 Westpac Airlines
 Wings West Airlines
 Wright Airlines

Former Military operators

Chilean Air Force, eight 99As delivered in 1971.

Royal Thai Army, one C99 delivered in 1969.

Other small commuter airlines in the U.S. and Canada operated the Beechcraft Model 99 as well. The aircraft has also been used in air cargo feeder operations transporting freight.

In addition, Texas International Airlines, which operated Douglas DC-9-10 and McDonnell Douglas DC-9-30 jetliners as well as Convair 600 turboprops, also flew several Beechcraft 99A aircraft during the early 1970s.

References 

99
Beechcraft aircraft